Victorious is the tenth studio album by American Christian rock band Skillet, released on August 2, 2019. The album was announced on May 7, 2019, and a lyric video was released for the track "Legendary" at the same time on the band's YouTube channel. The band released the song "You Ain't Ready" on July 26, 2019, as a promotional single. "Legendary" was later chosen to be the new theme song for a new look WWE Raw, which debuted in 2019.

Background and recording

Skillet released their previous studio album, Unleashed, in 2016. During the production stage for Victorious, lead singer John Cooper and his wife, Korey, solely produced half of the album while joining Seth Mosley and Mike "X" O'Connor for two other songs.

Composition
In an interview with Radio.com, lead singer John Cooper said the album was composed of fight songs and that he wanted to let others know that "you can be victorious through the trials of life, but life is going to suck sometimes".
In regards to specific tracks, Cooper told Billboard that "Legendary" was about making the most out of your life and referenced the past criticism the band received about their musical path. Upon the launch of the music video for "Legendary", Cooper told People that the song's meaning was "to live your life the way you think you should". Cooper also added that "Legendary" was chosen as the first released single because of the pumped up energy levels.

Promotion and release
On May 7, Billboard reported the release date for Victorious was August 2 and included the newly released lyric video for "Legendary". The song became a single for rock radio stations on May 20 and had a later music video published in July 2019. For their other songs released before the album's release, Skillet had "Anchor" and "Save Me" available to stream on June 14 while "Anchor" became a Christian radio single on July 19. On July 26, "You Ain't Ready" was made available alongside an accompanying lyric video.

Touring
In April 2019, Skillet revealed they would be embarking on a tour throughout the United States alongside Sevendust. The Victorious War started on August 11 in Memphis, Tennessee and ended on September 7 in Tulsa, Oklahoma. After the tour with Sevendust, Skillet started a one-month North American tour with Alter Bridge called the Victorious Sky Tour, running from September 22 to October 25.

Reception
{{Album ratings
| MC =
| rev1 = AllMusic
| rev1score = <ref name=allmusic>{{AllMusic | id= mw0003285735 | title= 'Victorious | access-date= August 6, 2019}}</ref>
| rev2 = Jesus Freak Hideout
| rev2score = 
}}

Neil Z. Yeung of AllMusic called the album a "satisfying, defiant, and rousing collection of spiritual hype music". Alternatively, David Craft of Jesus Freak Hideout felt that the band was limiting themselves on the album and "seem to be stuck on recreating Comatose''".

Accolades

Track listing
The track listing was released along with the album announcement. Credits adapted from CD booklet.

Personnel 
Skillet
 John Cooper – vocals, bass guitar, additional guitars (7)
 Korey Cooper – programming (1-5, 7-10, 12, 13), keyboards (4, 7, 10, 11), additional programming (6, 11), additional guitars (10)
 Seth Morrison – lead guitars
 Jen Ledger – drums, vocals

Additional musicians
 Chris Marvin – additional backing vocals (1, 3, 4, 5, 13), additional guitars (3, 5), backing vocals (7, 8)
 Seth Mosley – keyboards (4, 7), programming (4, 7), additional guitars (4, 7, 11), additional backing vocals (4), backing vocals (7)
 Mike "X" O'Connor – keyboards (4, 7, 11), programming (4, 7), additional guitars (4, 10, 11), additional programming (11)
 Tate Olson – cello (3, 13)
 Drew Griffin – viola (3, 13), violin (3, 13), additional guitars (13)
 Cara Fox – strings (4, 7)
 Eleonore Denning – strings (4, 7)
 Rosalie Marvin – additional backing vocals (3, 13), backing vocals (5)

Production
 Zachary Kelm – executive producer, management 
 John Cooper – producer (1, 3, 7, 8, 10, 12, 13), editing (1), engineer (3, 8, 13)
 Korey Cooper – producer (1, 3, 7, 8, 10, 12, 13), engineer (1, 3, 7, 8, 10-13)
 Kevin Churko – producer (2, 5), engineer (2, 5), mixing (2, 5)
 Seth Mosley – producer (4, 7, 10, 11)
 Mike "X" O'Connor – producer (4, 7, 10, 11), engineer (4, 7, 10, 11), editing (4, 7, 10)
 Nick Rad – engineer (1, 3, 8, 12, 13), editing (1, 3, 8, 10, 12, 13), mixing (13)
 Kane Churko – engineer (2, 5)
 Jericho Scroggins – engineer (7, 10, 11), production assistant (7, 10)
 Neal Avron – mixing (1, 3, 4, 7-12)
 Tristan Hardin – Pro Tools editing (2, 5)
 Nick Schwartz – editing (4, 7, 11)
 Ted Jensen – mastering at Sterling Sound (New York, NY)
 Pete Ganbarg – A&R direction 
 Andrew Kemp – A&R direction
 Anne Declemente – A&R administration 
 Mark Obraski – art direction, design 
 Chino Villatoro – photography 
 Chrissy Yoder – photography

Charts

Weekly charts

Year-end charts

References

Skillet (band) albums
2019 albums